The Master of the Schotten Altarpiece was a German painter, active in Nuremberg during the 14th and 15th centuries.  His name is derived from an altarpiece dated to about 1390, which once stood in the church of St. Mary in Schotten.  The altarpiece was dismantled in 1828.

14th-century German painters
15th-century German painters
Schotten Altarpiece, Master of the